Miecznikowo may refer to the following places in Poland:

Miecznikowo-Cygany
Miecznikowo-Gołębie
Miecznikowo-Kołaki
Miecznikowo-Miąchy
Miecznikowo-Siwe
Miecznikowo-Sowy